In enzymology, a sterol-4alpha-carboxylate 3-dehydrogenase (decarboxylating) is an enzyme that catalyzes the chemical reaction

3beta-hydroxy-4beta-methyl-5alpha-cholest-7-ene-4alpha-carboxylate + NAD(P)+  4alpha-methyl-5alpha-cholest-7-en-3-one + CO2 + NAD(P)H

The 3 substrates of this enzyme are 3beta-hydroxy-4beta-methyl-5alpha-cholest-7-ene-4alpha-carboxylate, NAD+, and NADP+, whereas its 4 products are 4alpha-methyl-5alpha-cholest-7-en-3-one, CO2, NADH, and NADPH.

This enzyme belongs to the family of oxidoreductases, specifically those acting on the CH-OH group of donor with NAD+ or NADP+ as acceptor. The systematic name of this enzyme class is 3beta-hydroxy-4beta-methyl-5alpha-cholest-7-ene-4alpha-carboxylate:NAD(P)+ 3-oxidoreductase (decarboxylating). Other names in common use include 3beta-hydroxy-4beta-methylcholestenecarboxylate 3-dehydrogenase, (decarboxylating), 3beta-hydroxy-4beta-methylcholestenoate dehydrogenase, 3beta-hydroxy-4beta-methylcholestenoate dehydrogenase, and sterol 4alpha-carboxylic decarboxylase. This enzyme participates in biosynthesis of steroids.

References

 
 

EC 1.1.1
NADPH-dependent enzymes
NADH-dependent enzymes
Enzymes of unknown structure